Ince-in-Makerfield is a town in the Metropolitan Borough of Wigan, Greater Manchester, England.  The town and the surrounding area contains eight listed buildings that are recorded in the National Heritage List for England.  All the listed buildings are designated at Grade II, the lowest of the three grades, which is applied to "buildings of national importance and special interest".

During the 19th century it was an industrial area, with coal mining, iron smelting, engineering works and chemical factories, but none of the listed buildings are directly connected with these industries.  The Leeds and Liverpool Canal runs through the area, and associated with this locks and a bridge are listed.  The other listed buildings are houses, buildings in a cemetery, and a church.
 

Buildings

References

Citations

Sources

Lists of listed buildings in Greater Manchester